This is a list of films produced by the Ollywood film industry based in Bhubaneshwar and Cuttack in 2009:

A-Z

References

2009
Ollywood
2000s in Orissa
2009 in Indian cinema